Liam Price (February 1891 – 1967) was a County Wicklow judge, historian and former president of the Royal Society of Antiquaries of Ireland (RSAI) who published work on historical topography and the history of placenames, especially for the county of Wicklow, where he was a district justice. His work on these areas has been published in journals and books and his contribution, totalling about 40 papers,  was acknowledged in a special issue of the Journal of the Royal Society of Antiquaries of Ireland in 1965, shortly before his death in 1967.

Education and employment 
 MA (TCD) Classics (awarded Senior Moderatorship and Vice-Chancellor's Latin Medal for his study of Lucretius)
 Appointed District Justice 1922 and assigned to Wicklow District 1924
 Retired 1960
 Honorary doctorate (University College Dublin) 1965

Professional associations
 Member of the National Monuments Advisory Council
 Member of the Archaeological Exploration Committee of the Royal Irish Academy
 Member of the Irish Folklore Commission
 Member of the Board of Visitors of the National Museum of Ireland
 Member of the Irish Place-names Commission
 Member 1926–1933; fellow 1934–1959; honorary life fellow from 1959; member of the council 1931–1934; honorary editor 1935–1944, 1957–1963; president 1949-1952 of the Royal Society of Antiquaries of Ireland

Publications

Books
 The Liam Price notebooks: the placenames, antiquities and topography of County Wicklow, Published by the Department of the Environment, Dublin, 2002.
 The Place Names of County Wicklow (two parts published by Royal Irish Academy, subsequent 6 parts published by the Dublin Institute for Advanced Studies)

Selected journal articles
 Hearth Money Rolls for County Wicklow - transcription of placenames appearing on Hearth Money Rolls dating from 1668.
 The ages of stone and bronze in county Wicklow - details the archaeological evidence for settlements in South County Dublin and Wicklow including a series of sepulchral urns held at the National Museum  of Ireland, one from Powerscourt, Co. Wicklow.
 The antiquities and placenames of South County Dublin - draws information from the Down survey maps to describe various antiquities across the south of County Dublin, including Ballinascorney, Tallaght Hill and Saggart Hill
 Powerscourt and the territory of Fercullen - describes the medieval history of North county Wicklow and the ancient territory of Fercullen, granted to the O'Tooles in 1540.

References

External links 
 The Royal Society of Antiquaries of Ireland

1967 deaths
People from County Wicklow
District Court (Ireland) judges
Irish antiquarians
1891 births
20th-century antiquarians